Alo TV is a local interactive television channel in Tartu, Estonia. It includes 24/7 music videos and news. On weekdays it also shows local information. The Alo TV broadcast area was formerly restricted to Tartu and Tartu County, but since 2009 the channel is included in Elion digital TV and Starman cable TV services. The channel is included also Freeview HybridTV list

Alo TV was first broadcast from the Estonian University of Life Sciences dormitory skyscraper.

External links
 

Mass media in Tartu
Television channels in Estonia
Television channels and stations established in 1992
Music television channels
1992 establishments in Estonia
Music organizations based in Estonia